Doris viridis is a species of sea slug, a dorid nudibranch, a marine gastropod mollusk in the family Dorididae.

Distribution
This species was described from Tahiti. It has been reported from the Hawaiian Islands and Red Beach, Hontou (East coast), Okinawa, Japan.

References

Dorididae
Gastropods described in 1861